Meeker is an unincorporated community in Marion County, in the U.S. state of Ohio.

History
A former variant name was Cochranton, after Col. William Cochran, the original owner of the town site. A post office called Cochranton was established in 1829, the name was changed to Meeker in 1908, and the post office closed in 1943. The present name was adopted in honor of one Mr. Meeker, the treasurer of a local railroad project.

References

Unincorporated communities in Marion County, Ohio
Unincorporated communities in Ohio